Papiaru may refer to several places in Estonia:

Papiaru, Lääne-Viru County, village in Sõmeru Parish, Lääne-Viru County
Papiaru, Tartu County, village in Vara Parish, Tartu County